Kyle Koch (born December 10, 1984) is a former professional Canadian football offensive linemen who played in the Canadian Football League. He played CIS Football for the McMaster Marauders.  He was originally signed by the Winnipeg Blue Bombers as an undrafted free agent in 2007. From 2009-2012, Koch played with the Edmonton Eskimos. On September 10, 2013, Koch signed with the Toronto Argonauts. On May 16, 2014, Koch retired from Canadian football.

Further reading

External links
Winnipeg Blue Bombers bio

1984 births
Living people
Canadian football offensive linemen
Edmonton Elks players
McMaster Marauders football players
Sportspeople from Kenora
Players of Canadian football from Ontario
Toronto Argonauts players
Winnipeg Blue Bombers players